This is a shortened version of the second chapter of the ICD-9: Neoplasms. It covers ICD codes 140 to 239. The full chapter can be found on pages 101 to 144 of Volume 1, which contains all (sub)categories of the ICD-9. Volume 2 is an alphabetical index of Volume 1. Both volumes can be downloaded for free from the website of the World Health Organization.

See here for a tabular overview of primary, secondary, in situ, and benign neoplasms.

Malignant neoplasm of lip, oral cavity, and pharynx (140–149)
  Malignant neoplasm of lip
  Malignant neoplasm of tongue
  Malignant neoplasm of major salivary glands
  Malignant neoplasm of gum
  Malignant neoplasm of floor of mouth
  Malignant neoplasm of other and unspecified parts of mouth
  Malignant neoplasm of oropharynx
  Malignant neoplasm of nasopharynx
  Malignant neoplasm of hypopharynx
  Malignant neoplasm of other and ill-defined sites within the lip

Malignant neoplasm of digestive organs and peritoneum (150–159)
  Malignant neoplasm of esophagus
  Malignant neoplasm of stomach
  Malignant neoplasm of small intestine, including duodenum
  Malignant neoplasm colon
  Malignant neoplasm of rectum, rectosigmoid junction, and anus
  Malignant neoplasm of liver and intrahepatic bile ducts
  Malignant neoplasm of gallbladder and extrahepatic bile ducts
  Malignant neoplasm of pancreas
  Malignant neoplasm of retroperitoneum and peritoneum
  Malignant neoplasm of other and ill-defined sites within the

Malignant neoplasm of respiratory and intrathoracic organs (160–165)
  Malignant neoplasm of nasal cavities, middle ear, and accessory sinuses
  Malignant neoplasm of larynx
  Malignant neoplasm of trachea, bronchus, and lung
  Trachea
  Main bronchus
  Upper lobe, bronchus or lung
  Middle lobe, bronchus or lung
  Lower lobe, bronchus or lung
  Other parts of bronchus or lung
  Bronchus and lung, unspecified
  Malignant neoplasm of pleura
  Malignant neoplasm of thymus, heart, and mediastinum
  Malignant neoplasm of other and ill-defined sites within the respiratory system and intrathoracic organs

Malignant neoplasm of bone, connective tissue, skin, and breast (170–175)
  Malignant neoplasm of bone and articular cartilage
  Malignant neoplasm of bone and articular cartilage, site unspecified
 Ewing's sarcoma
 Osteosarcoma
 Chondrosarcoma
  Malignant neoplasm of connective and other soft tissue
 Rhabdomyosarcoma
  Malignant melanoma of skin
  Other malignant neoplasm of skin
  Malignant neoplasm of female breast
  Malignant neoplasm of male breast

Kaposi's sarcoma (176–176)
  Kaposi's sarcoma
  Kaposi's sarcoma skin
  Kaposi's sarcoma soft tissue
  Kaposi's sarcoma palate
  Kaposi's sarcoma gastrointestinal sites
  Kaposi's sarcoma
  Kaposi's sarcoma lymph nodes
  Kaposi's sarcoma other specified sites
  Kaposi's sarcoma unspecified site

Malignant neoplasm of genitourinary organs (179–189)
  Malignant neoplasm of uterus, part unspecified
  Malignant neoplasm of cervix uteri
  Malignant neoplasm of placenta
  Malignant neoplasm of body of uterus
  Corpus uteri, except isthmus
 Endometrial cancer
  Malignant neoplasm of ovary and other uterine adnexa
  Malignant neoplasm of other and unspecified female genital organs
  Malignant neoplasm of prostate
  Malignant neoplasm of testis
  Malignant neoplasm of penis and other male genital organs
  Malignant neoplasm of bladder
  Malignant neoplasm of kidney and other and unspecified urinary organs
  Kidney, except pelvis
 Renal cell carcinoma

Malignant neoplasm of other and unspecified sites (190–199)
  Malignant neoplasm of eye
  Malignant neoplasm of brain
  Malignant neoplasm of other and unspecified parts of nervous system
  Cranial nerve
  Cerebral meninges
 Meningioma
  Spinal cord
  Spinal meninges
  Malignant neoplasm of thyroid gland
  Malignant neoplasm of other endocrine glands and related structures
  Malignant neoplasm of other and ill-defined sites
  Secondary and unspecified malignant neoplasm of lymph nodes
  Secondary malignant neoplasm of respiratory and digestive systems
  Secondary malignant neoplasm of other specified sites
  Malignant neoplasm without specification of site

Malignant neoplasm of lymphatic and hematopoietic tissue (200–208)
  Lymphosarcoma and reticulosarcoma
  Reticulosarcoma
  Lymphosarcoma
  Burkitt's tumor or lymphoma
  Marginal zone lymphoma
  Mantle cell lymphoma
  Primary central nervous system lymphoma
  Anaplastic large cell lymphoma
  Large cell lymphoma
  Other named variants of lymphosarcoma and reticulosarcoma
  Hodgkin's disease
  Other malignant neoplasms of lymphoid and histiocytic tissue
  Nodular lymphoma
  Mycosis fungoides
  Sézary's disease
  Malignant histiocytosis
  Leukemic reticuloendotheliosis (commonly called hairy cell leukemia)
  Letterer-Siwe disease
  Malignant mast cell tumors
  Peripheral T-cell lymphoma
  Other lymphomas
  Other and unspecified malignant neoplasms of lymphoid and histiocytic tissue
  Multiple myeloma and immunoproliferative neoplasms
  Multiple myeloma
  Lymphoid leukemia
  Acute lymphoblastic leukemia
  Chronic lymphocytic leukemia
  Myeloid leukemia
  Acute myelogenous leukemia
  Chronic myelogenous leukemia
  Monocytic leukemia
  Other specified leukemia
  Acute erythremia and erythroleukemia
  Chronic erythremia
  Megakaryocytic leukemia
  Leukemia of unspecified cell type

Neuroendocrine tumors (209–209)
  Neuroendocrine tumors
  Malignant carcinoid tumors of the small intestine
  Malignant carcinoid tumors of the appendix, large intestine, and rectum
  Malignant carcinoid tumors of other and unspecified sites
  Malignant poorly differentiated neuroendocrine carcinoma
  Benign carcinoid tumors of the small intestine
  Benign carcinoid tumors of the appendix, large intestine, and rectum
  Benign carcinoid tumors of other and unspecified sites

Benign neoplasms (210–229)
  Benign neoplasm of lip, oral cavity, and pharynx
  Benign neoplasm of other parts of digestive system
  Colon
 Familial adenomatous polyposis
  Benign neoplasm of respiratory and intrathoracic organs
  Nasal cavities middle ear and accessory sinuses
  Larynx
  Trachea
  Bronchus and lung
  Pleura
  Mediastinum
  Thymus
  Heart
 Myxoma
 Rhabdomyoma
  Benign neoplasm of bone and articular cartilage
  Bone and articular cartilage, site unspecified
 Chondroma
  Lipoma
  Other benign neoplasm of connective and other soft tissue
  Benign neoplasm of skin
 Melanocytic nevus
  Benign neoplasm of breast
  Uterine leiomyoma
  Other benign neoplasm of uterus
  Benign neoplasm of ovary
  Benign neoplasm of other female genital organs
  Benign neoplasm of male genital organs
  Benign neoplasm of kidney and other urinary organs
  Benign neoplasm of eye
  Benign neoplasm of brain and other parts of nervous system
  Benign neoplasm of thyroid glands
  Benign neoplasm of other endocrine glands and related structures
  Hemangioma and lymphangioma, any site
  Hemangioma, any site
  Lymphangioma, any site
  Benign neoplasm of other and unspecified sites

Carcinoma in situ (230–234)
  Carcinoma in situ of digestive organs
  Carcinoma in situ of respiratory system
  Carcinoma in situ of skin
  Carcinoma in situ of breast and genitourinary system
  Carcinoma in situ of other and unspecified sites

Neoplasms of uncertain behavior (235–238)
  Neoplasm of uncertain behavior of digestive and respiratory systems
  Neoplasm of uncertain behavior of genitourinary organs
  Neoplasm of uncertain behavior of endocrine glands and nervous system
  Pituitary gland and craniopharyngeal duct
 Pituitary adenoma
  Neurofibromatosis
  Neoplasm of uncertain behavior of other and unspecified sites and tissues
  Polycythemia vera

Neoplasms of unspecified nature (239–239)
  Neoplasms of unspecified nature
  Skin, soft tissue neoplasm, unspecified

International Classification of Diseases